Virruddh... Family Comes First is an Indian Hindi-language drama film, released in 2005, directed by Mahesh Manjrekar. The film stars Amitabh Bachchan, Sharmila Tagore, Sanjay Dutt and John Abraham. Viruddh is not a musical, instead the soundtrack is primarily used as background. Marathi movie 'Kokanastha' also written and directed by Mahesh Manjrekar has a similar plot.

Plot 

The film begins with Amar (John Abraham) narrating the story of his family and himself. Amar is the son of Vidyadhar (Amitabh Bachchan) & Sumitra Patwardhan (Sharmila Tagore), a middle class couple in India. Amar lives and works in London and he sends some of his salary to them. One day Amar returns home with Jenny Mayer (Anusha Dandekar), his girlfriend, and announces his intention to marry her. Initially reluctant, his parents are pleased and happy for the two. One day, Amar goes out celebrating with his friends, whilst his parents and Jenny organise a surprise birthday party for him.

Outside a pub, Amar witnesses a murder and, while trying to apprehend the killer, he gets mortally wounded in the fight. Amar succumbs in the hospital. The assailant is identified as Harshwardhan Kadam (Amitabh Dayal), son of minister Mr. Kadam. Soon, the police start covering the case up. Amar is implicated in false charges of drug peddling. Witnesses and close friends of Amar too give false statements. The torture doesn't end there, as police try to implicate Jenny as his accomplice and threaten to rape her.

Vidyadhar decides that it is not good for Jenny to live there, especially since she is expecting Amar's child. Vidyadhar bails her out and implores her to return before she is locked up for good. Harshwardhan goes scot free meanwhile and Vidyadhar decides to seek justice on his own after he is failed to get any sort of justice. Ali Asgar (Sanjay Dutt), a former goon and mechanic, also an acquaintance of Patwardhans, decides to help them. Soon, Ali succeeds in procuring a gun for Vidyadhar.

Vidyadhar decides to confront Harshwardhan in his own office. Harshwardhan cockily lets him enter in and starts taunting him. Vidyadhar accuses him and Harshwardhan arrogantly confesses his crimes, telling Vidyadhar that he cannot prove a thing. Vidyadhar points the gun at him, upon which Harshwardhan calls one of his guard. Vidyadhar guns down Harshwardhan and the guard enter in moments later Harshwardhan's cadaver collapses down. Harshwardhan's head guard lets Vidyadhar go, claiming that he won't be able to look at his family in the eye if he arrests Vidyadhar.

A case stands up against Vidyadhar, where he reveals a pocket tape recorder on which the whole confession of Harshwardhan is recorded. Based on the proof, Amar and Vidyadhar are exonerated and set free. In an interview, Vidyadhar makes it clear that he doesn't intend to sue Mr. Kadam or police since Harshwardhan was killed and Vidyadhar knows the pain.

In the end, it is shown that Vidyadhar is living a happy life with Sumitra, Jenny, and his grandchild. Amar now explains that his father has always been a hero for him since childhood and he is feeling a little jealous of his daughter who is being treated with same affection with which Vidyadhar treated Amar in his childhood. The film ends with Amar disappearing in light claiming now he can rest in peace.

Cast 

 Amitabh Bachchan as Vidhyadhar Patwardhan
 Sharmila Tagore as Sumitra Patwardhan
 Sanjay Dutt as Ali Asgar
 John Abraham as Amar Patwardhan
 Anusha Dandekar as Jenny
 Prem Chopra as Mr. Sumit Arora
 Sharat Saxena as Mr. Raju Shetty
 Beena as Mrs. Chitnis
 Shivaji Satam as Mr. Sunil Bharucha
 Sachin Khedekar as Inspector Desai
 Amitabh Dayal as Harshwardhan Kadam
 Viju Khote as Minister Kadam
 Tom Alter as Mr. Jack Anderson (British Consulate)
Dimple Inamdar as Sandhya

Awards 

 51st Filmfare Awards:

Nominated

 Best Actress – Sharmila Tagore

Soundtrack
The soundtrack of the film was scored by Ajay–Atul.

References

External links 

2005 films
2000s Hindi-language films
Indian drama films
Films directed by Mahesh Manjrekar
Films scored by Anand Raj Anand
Films scored by Ajay–Atul
2005 drama films
Hindi-language drama films